Market Mall is one of the largest malls in Calgary, Alberta, Canada.

Market Mall may also refer to:

 Market Mall (Saskatoon), a shopping centre in Saskatoon, Saskatchewan, Canada

See also
 Festival Flea Market Mall, an indoor flea market mall in Pompano Beach, Florida, U.S.
 Market hall (disambiguation)
 Market Place Mall, an enclosed shopping mall located in Champaign, Illinois, U.S.
 Market Village Mall, a former shopping mall in Markham, Ontario, Canada
 Westland Market Mall, a mall in Spruce Grove, Alberta, Canada